Dominican Republic passports are issued to citizens of the Dominican Republic to travel outside the country.

Controversy 
In May 2001, Kim Jong-nam, the eldest son of then North Korean dictator Kim Jong-il,  was arrested at Narita International Airport, in Tokyo, Japan, travelling on a forged Dominican Republic passport. He was detained by immigration officials and later deported to the People's Republic of China. The incident caused Kim Jong-il to cancel a planned visit to China due to the embarrassment caused by the incident.

Visa requirements 

As of 07 July 2021, Dominican Republic citizens had visa-free or visa on arrival access to 70 countries and territories, ranking the Dominican Republic passport 79th in terms of travel freedom, according to the Henley visa restrictions index.

See also 
 Visa requirements for Dominican Republic citizens
 Dominicana passport information on PRADO
 List of passports

References

External links 
 Dominican Republic's Passport Official Website

 http://translate.google.nl/translate?hl=nl&langpair=es|nl&u=http://jeantaveras.host56.com/2009/03/paises-los-que-no-se-requiere-visa-para.html

Government of the Dominican Republic
Passports by country